"I'll Take You Home Again, Kathleen" is a popular song written by Thomas Paine Westendorf (1848-1923) in 1875. (The music is loosely based on Felix Mendelssohn's Violin Concerto in E Flat Minor Opus 64 Second Movement). In spite of its German-American origins, it is widely mistaken to be an Irish ballad.

Westendorf, born in Virginia of German parents, was then teaching at the reform school known as the Indiana House of Refuge for Juvenile Offenders in Hendricks County, Indiana. He wrote it for his wife (who was, however, named Jennie), who had made a visit to her home state of New York due to homesickness. It's in the form of an "answer" to a popular ballad of the time, "Barney, Take Me Home Again," composed by Westendorf’s close friend, George W. Brown, writing under the nom de plume of George W. Persley.

Recorded versions

A version by Will Oakland on Edison Amberol (catalog 1102) was very popular in 1912.
On 30 January 2011 Jon Boden released a version as part of his A Folk Song A Day project.
On March 31, 1971 Johnny Cash sang a version of this song on the 56th episode of his television show The Johnny Cash Show (TV series).
Frank Connors (released by Varsity Records) as catalog number 519, with the B-side "When Irish Eyes Are Smiling")
Eugene Conley, American operatic tenor, recorded a version released by London Records.
Michael Crawford performed the song for his album In Concert in 1998, and also in his concert tour.
Bing Crosby and John Scott Trotter's Orchestra (recorded July 17, 1945, released by Decca Records as catalog numbers 18721B and 28261, both with the B-side "The Bells of St. Mary's"; also as catalog number 23789B with the B-side "Too-Ra-Loo-Ra-Loo-Ral")
Merv Griffin (released by RCA Victor Records as catalog number 20-4749, with the B-side "Wild Colonial Boy")
Irish tenor Josef Locke recorded a version around the late 1940s.
Danny Malone (recorded November 27, 1934, released by Decca Records as catalog number 12052A, with the B-side "All That I Want Is in Ireland")
Mitch Miller – Favorite Irish Folk Songs – Originally released 1959 Sony BMG MUSIC ENTERTAINMENT – USSM10020418
Henry Moeller (released by Gennett Records as catalog number 10069, with the B-side "Sing Me To Sleep")
Popular English-born singer Cavan O'Connor recorded and regularly performed the song.
British novelty pop band Lieutenant Pigeon (released by Decca Records in 1974 as Decca F13486), with the B-side "Big Butch Baby", reached #3 in Australia.
Elvis Presley released a version (with overdubbed accompaniment) of him singing to his own piano-playing on the 1973 self-titled album called Elvis on RCA Records, better known as The Fool album.  He can be seen rehearsing the song by himself in the 1981 documentary This Is Elvis as taken from the footage for the 1970 film That's the Way It Is. He can also be heard performing the same song while in the Army while stationed in Germany in the so-called "Bad Neuheim Medley" of the 1997 RCA CD boxset Platinum: A Life In Music.
Oscar Seagle (recorded September 1915, released by Columbia Records as catalog number A-5718, with the B-side "The Bloom Is on the Rye")
Vaughan Quartet (released by Vaughan Records as catalog number 725, with the B-side "When Honey Sings an Old Time Song")
Tenor and Chorus with Orchestra, Walter Van Brunt. Edison Diamond Disc, 1914, Disc 80160-R. B-side "On The Banks of the Brandywine".
Lew White (released by Victor Records as catalog number 27467, with the B-side "On the Wings of Song")
Clarence Whitehill (recorded July 30, 1914, released by Victor Records as catalog number 74425 (a single-sided record); also as catalog number 1275, with the B-side "In the Gloaming")
Victor Young and his Orchestra (released by Decca Records as catalog number 28194, with the B-side "My Mother")
Slim Whitman recorded a version in 1957, on Imperial 8310, also issued in the UK on London HLP 8403.
Daniel O'Donnell recorded the song, where it was released on the album, "Irish Collection", in 1997.
Scottish tenor Robert Wilson released a version in the late 1940s.

In television
In the second series episode "Antony's Birthday" of the British TV series The Royle Family, the family's neighbour Joe Carroll (played by Peter Martin), normally very quiet and retiring, gives a well-received rendition of the song.
In the Star Trek (TOS) episode, "The Naked Time" (first aired Sep. 29, 1966), the crew of the Enterprise is affected by a substance, unknowingly picked up from an uninhabited, frozen planet named Psi 2000 about to break up, which brings repressed feelings and behavior to the surface. One crewman, Lt. Kevin Thomas Riley, who "fancies himself a descendant of Irish kings" (as described by Science Officer Spock), locks himself in Engineering and shuts the engines off, causing the ship to decay its orbit toward the disintegrating planet. While the behavior-altering disease spreads throughout the ship and the ship continues to fall toward the planet, Riley adds to the stress by repeatedly singing, "I'll Take You Home Again, Kathleen" in a half-drunken manner through ship-wide communication speakers.

References

External links
 I'll Take You Home Again, Kathleen sheet music at the New York Public Library Digital Collections
 Lyrics and MIDI
 Willie Sutherland version on Youtube.
 Blow the Candle Out Blow the Candle Out – Irish folk tune

1875 songs
American songs
Traditional pop songs
Slim Whitman songs